Mass surveillance is the pervasive surveillance of an entire or a substantial fraction of a population. Mass surveillance in India includes Surveillance, Telephone tapping, Open-source intelligence, Lawful interception, and surveillance under Indian Telegraph Act, 1885.

In recent years, India has seen use of facial-recognition technology by the law enforcement. Telangana is the most surveilled state in India with 36 CCTV cameras per 1,000 people.

Indian Mass Surveillance Projects

India has been using many mass surveillance projects for many years. These include the following:

DRDO Netra

DRDO NETRA is another mass surveillance project of India. It has been developed by the Center for Artificial Intelligence & Robotics (CAIR) laboratory under the Defence Research and Development Organisation. The system could detect selective words like “bomb”, “blast”, “attack” or “kill” within seconds from emails, instant messages, status updates and tweets. The system will also be capable of gauging suspicious voice traffic on Skype and Google Talk. To enhance the capacity of the DRDO NETRA Project Black Knight was initiated in late 2013 to monitor social media trends and identify source of various viral messages that posed a risk to tranquility of the global community. Not much detail is available about the project, but it is rumored that the group of engineers later founded a private organization and now conducts social media analysis on Indian and foreign subjects by tapping fiber optic cables in India and overseas, including cybertapping infrastructure on the main internet communication cable in Mongolia which links rest of the world to China.

Lawful Intercept And Monitoring Project

Lawful Intercept and Monitoring, abbreviated to LIM, is a clandestine mass electronic surveillance program deployed by the Centre for Development of Telematics (C-DOT), an Indian Government owned telecommunications technology development centre. LIM systems are used by the Indian Government to intercept records of voice, SMSs, GPRS data, details of a subscriber's application and recharge history and call detail record (CDR)  and monitor Internet traffic, emails, web-browsing, Skype and any other Internet activity of Indian users. Mobile operators deploy their own LIM system which allows the government to intercept calls, after taking “due authorisation” in compliance with Section 5(2) of the Indian Telegraph Act read with Rule 419(A) of the IT Rules. The LIM system to monitor Internet traffic is deployed by the government at the international gateways of some large ISPs (between the ISPs Internet Edge Router (PE) and the core network). These surveillance systems are under complete control of the government, and their functioning is secretive and unknown to the ISPs.

NCCC

National Cyber Coordination Centre (NCCC) is a proposed cyber security and e-surveillance project of India. It aims at screening communication metadata and co-ordinate the intelligence gathering activities of other agencies. In the absence of any legal framework and parliamentary oversight, the NCCC could encroach upon Indian citizens' privacy and civil-liberties.

Telecom Enforcement Resource and Monitoring Project

Telecom Enforcement Resource and Monitoring (TERM), formerly known as Vigilance Telecom Monitoring (VTM), is the vigilance and monitoring wing of the Indian Department of Telecommunications (DoT). The main functions of TERM Cells are vigilance, monitoring and security of the network. Apart from this, TERM Cells also operate the Central Monitoring System and carry out other functions.

Central Monitoring System Project

Central Monitoring System is a surveillance related project of India. The project is run by Centre for Development of Telematics

See also
Surveillance in India
List of Indian intelligence agencies
Multi Agency Centre (India)
NATGRID
Telecom Enforcement Resource and Monitoring

References

India
Privacy in India
Human rights abuses in India